Dramarama is a British children's anthology series broadcast on ITV between 1983 and 1989. The series tended to feature single dramas with a science fiction, supernatural and occasionally satirical theme. It was created by Anna Home, then head of children's and youth programming at TVS; however, the dramas themselves were produced by a total of twelve ITV regional companies. Thus, each episode was in practice a one-off production with its own cast and crew, up to and including the executive producer.

Dramarama was largely a showcase for new talent to television and offered debuts for Anthony Horowitz, Paul Abbott, Kay Mellor, Janice Hally, Tony Kearney, David Tennant and Ann Marie Di Mambro. It was also one of Dennis Spooner's last works.

One of the stories, Thames' "Dodger, Bonzo And The Rest" from 1984, proved so popular that it was spun off into its own series and Christmas special the following year - the series starred Lee Ross and recounted life in a large foster home. Another story, Granada's "Blackbird Singing in the Dead of Night" from 1988, was developed into the long-running series Children's Ward. The original Dramarama story was co-written by Paul Abbott and Kay Mellor - at the time, working as staff writers for Granada.

The series has rarely been repeated in recent years, although two episodes - "Blackbird Singing in the Dead of Night" and "Back to Front" - were broadcast on the CITV Channel as part of a 30th anniversary weekend in January 2013.

Only four ITV companies of the time did not contribute to the series: Anglia, Channel, Grampian and LWT.

TVS produced the greatest number of episodes.

Home media
A videotape containing the episodes "Big T for Trouble", "Just Wild About Harry" and "Venchie" (all Tyne Tees productions) was released by Video Gems, c. 1990. It is now out of print.

All episodes produced by Thames Television have been released on DVD by Network on 13 January 2012, who have also released the 1983 series Spooky which was shown under the Dramarama banner on 15 August 2011. The home video rights to the remaining episodes are held by ITV Studios, aside from those produced by Scottish, TVS and the one episode produced by TSW. The TVS episodes cannot be released commercially but some have appeared on YouTube, and STV itself placed all its episodes on YouTube in 2010, but has since removed them.

Episodes

Spooky (1983)

Series 1 (1983)

Series 2 (1984)

Series 3 (1985)

Series 4 (1986)

Series 5 (1987)

Series 6 (1988-9)

Series 7 (1989)

References

External links
Dramarama at TheTVDB

English-language television shows
1980s British children's television series
1983 British television series debuts
1989 British television series endings
1980s British anthology television series
ITV children's television shows
Television series by ITV Studios
Television series by FremantleMedia Kids & Family
Television series by Yorkshire Television
Television shows produced by Border Television
Television shows produced by Central Independent Television
Television shows produced by Granada Television
Television shows produced by Harlech Television (HTV)
Television shows produced by Scottish Television
Television shows produced by Television South (TVS)
Television shows produced by Television South West (TSW)
Television shows produced by Thames Television
Television shows produced by Tyne Tees Television
British children's fantasy television series
British children's science fiction television series
Television shows produced by Ulster Television